Llan Ddu Fawr or Waun Claerddu is a hill located in Ceredigion, Wales, at  above sea level. It is located about 10 miles south of Pumlumon. The surrounding land can be very boggy. There is a trig point at the summit, but t
his is not the highest point. There is also a cairn of about 15 meters in diameter. The peak is located within the region known as the Desert of Wales.

References

External links
 www.hill-bagging.co.uk : Llan Ddu Fawr

Mountains and hills of Ceredigion
Marilyns of Wales